This is a list of pre-statehood alcaldes and mayors of San Jose, from 1777 to 1850, during the Spanish, Mexican, and early American periods, prior to California's admission to statehood.

Spanish era

Mexican era

American era

See also
Mayor of San Jose
List of pre-statehood mayors of Los Angeles
List of pre-statehood mayors of San Francisco
List of pre-statehood mayors of San Diego

References

Pre-Statehood Mayors
History of Santa Clara County, California
San Jose, California, before statehood
 
San Jose
San Jose
San Jose
San Jose